The Men's 2008 European Union Amateur Boxing Championships were held in Cetniewo, Poland from June 15 to June 22. The 6th edition of the annual competition was organised by the European governing body for amateur boxing, EABA. A total number of 119 fighters from across Europe competed at these championships.

Medal winners

External links
Results

References

2008 European Union Amateur Boxing Championships
European Union Amateur Boxing Championships
Boxing
European Union Amateur Boxing Championships
International boxing competitions hosted by Poland